Paul Cross may refer to:
 Paul Cross (footballer) (born 1965), footballer for Barnsley
 Paul Cross (rugby league), Australian rugby league footballer
 Paul Cross (swimmer) (born 1979), Australian Paralympic swimmer

See also
 St Paul's Cross
 Paul of the Cross (1694–1775), Italian mystic, and founder of the Passionists
 Cross (surname)